The Cape Cod Mystery, first published in 1931, is a detective story by Phoebe Atwood Taylor, the first to feature her series detective Asey Mayo, the "Codfish Sherlock".  This novel is a mystery of the type known as a whodunnit.

Plot summary

Dale Sanborn has made a lot of enemies in his career as a muckraking author, philanderer and occasional blackmailer.  When he vacations at a cabin in Cape Cod, any of his many visitors—an old girl friend, his fiancée, an outraged husband, a long-lost brother and a few more—the night he died could have killed him, and all of them wanted to.  When a respectable Boston matron is involved in the crime, local character Asey Mayo takes a hand and brings the case to a successful, if unexpected, conclusion.

1931 American novels
Novels by Phoebe Atwood Taylor
Novels set on Cape Cod and the Islands
Bobbs-Merrill Company books